The following lists events that happened during 1896 in Australia.

Incumbents

Governors of the Australian colonies
Governor of New South Wales – Henry Brand, 2nd Viscount Hampden
Governor of Queensland – Charles Cochrane-Baillie, 2nd Baron Lamington (from 9 April)
Governor of South Australia – Sir Thomas Buxton, 3rd Baronet
Governor of Tasmania – Jenico Preston, 14th Viscount Gormanston
Governor of Victoria – Thomas Brassey, 1st Earl Brassey
Governor of Western Australia – Sir Gerard Smith

Premiers of the Australian colonies
Premier of New South Wales – George Reid
Premier of Queensland – Hugh Nelson
Premier of South Australia – Charles Kingston
Premier of Tasmania – Edward Braddon
Premier of Western Australia – John Forrest
Premier of Victoria – George Turner

Events
 13 February - The Capsize of the ferry Pearl on the Brisbane River, killing 28

 27 October Passengers Alighting from Ferry Brighton at Manly the first film shot and screened in Australia

Arts and literature

 While the Billy Boils, a collection of short stories, is published by Henry Lawson
 Augustus Juncker (1855–1942) publishes English duet edition of I was dreaming popularised in the French opera Ma mie Rosette

Sport
7 to 11 April – Edwin Flack wins gold medals in the 800-metre and 1500 metre events, and bronze in the tennis doubles at the Games of the 1st Olympiad. He was the only Australian competitor at these games.
 3 October – The Victorian Football League is formed, with competition beginning in 1897.
 3 November – Newhaven wins the Melbourne Cup - the first horse-racing films produced in Australia.
 New South Wales wins the Sheffield Shield

Births
 22 January – Norman Gilroy, first Australian-born Cardinal (died 1977)
 8 February – Alfred Percival Bullen, circus proprietor (died 1974)
 18 February – John Cramer, politician (died 1994)
 5 July – Thomas Playford, Premier of South Australia (died 1981)
 11 July – Evelyn Scotney, coloratura soprano (died 1967)
 18 July – Jack Mullens, politician (died 1978)
 3 August – Charles Adermann, politician (died 1979)
 24 August – Edwin Corboy, politician (died 1950)
 28 August – Arthur Calwell, politician (died 1973)
 15 September – Norman Lethbridge Cowper, lawyer (died 1987)
 29 September – Thomas James Bede Kenny, soldier and Victoria Cross recipient (died 1953)
 21 October – Patrick Gordon Taylor, aviator (died 1966)
 16 November – Joan Lindsay, author (Picnic at Hanging Rock) (died 1984)
 27 November – Arthur Percy Sullivan, soldier and Victoria Cross recipient (died 1937)

Deaths
 27 April – Sir Henry Parkes (born 1815), politician
 15 September – John Anderson Hartley (born 1844), educator
 10 October – Ferdinand von Mueller (born 1825), botanist

See also
 List of Australian films before 1910

References

 
Australia
Years of the 19th century in Australia